Mohamed Ait El Hadj (born 22 March 2002) is an Algerian professional footballer who plays for USM Alger in the Algerian Ligue Professionnelle 1.

Career
On 16 January 2022, Mohamed Ait El Hadj made his first league appearance with USM Alger against MC Alger. Aït El Hadj was going to be free in the summer 2022, because his old contract was to expire on July 7, 2022, making it necessary for him to extend it as soon as possible, at the risk of seeing him join another club. Aït El Hadj and Abderraouf Othmani represent the future of the club, and it is therefore logical that they have been extended underlined the Usmist management. On 1 April, Ait El Hadj scored his first league goal against JS Kabylie.

Career statistics

Club

International career
In December 2022, Mohamed Ait El Hadj was called up by Madjid Bougherra for the first time to the Algeria A' National Team for a week-long training camp in Algiers. On January 2, 2023, Ait El Hadj was selected for the 28-man squad to participate in the 2022 African Nations Championship.

References

External links
 

2002 births
Living people
Algerian footballers
USM Alger players
Association football wingers
Footballers from Algiers
Algerian Ligue Professionnelle 1 players
Algeria under-23 international footballers
2022 African Nations Championship players
Algeria A' international footballers